The Last Word is an Australian television news and commentary program, broadcast on Sky News Live. The program is hosted and moderated by David Speers, and features regular panellists Paul Murray, Janine Perrett and Laura Jayes. The program sees the Sky News presenters discuss and debate news of the day, focusing primarily on political topics.

Speers typically presents the program from the Parliament House studio in Canberra, while the remaining panellists are usually in the Sky News centre in Sydney.

The format originated as the 20 minute final segment of PM Agenda, which Speers hosts. In 2016 The Last Word broke out to become its own program, replacing the final 30 minutes of PM Agenda, airing four-times weekly at 5:30pm AEST. James Bracey was a previous panelist before he left Sky News at the end of 2016.

References

External links
Sky News official site

Sky News Australia
Australian non-fiction television series
2016 Australian television series debuts
English-language television shows